Liu Yu (Chinese: 刘宇; born August 24, 2000) is a Chinese singer, dancer and model. He is best known as placing first on the final episode of Produce Camp 2021 and becoming a member of the Chinese project boy group INTO1.  He made his solo debut on November 22, 2020, with the single "Docked".

Early life and education
Liu Yu was born on August 24, 2000, in Jing County, Anhui. He studied traditional Chinese dance for sixteen years, beginning at age four. His parents divorced when he was young and he grew up under the care of his father.

He studied dance and was admitted as 26th in the country at the Beijing Academy of Dance, however, he had to withdraw as he suffered injuries that prevented him from attending. He also thought about attending the Communication University of China but he didn't.

Career

2018–2020: career beginnings, The Chinese Youth, and solo debut
In October 2018, Liu Yu appeared as a guest on the Chinese variety talent show Happy Camp, performing a Chinese traditional dance. After he appeared on the show, he gained a large following on Douyin.

In November 2018, he participated as a contestant on the Chinese reality show The Chinese Youth, a show focusing around Chinese culture. He entered the finals and ranked second place.

In June 2019, he appeared on the Chinese poetry culture show The Neighbourhood Poetry, performing a traditional Chinese dance. In August 2019, he released a collaborative single 垃圾分類等你來	(Garbage Sorting Song) alongside Shuangsheng, Qiran, and Shi Kai.

In November 2022, 2019, he made his solo debut with the single "靠岸" ("Docked"). On December 19, He released his second single "千歲" ("A Thousand Years"). On December 20, he won the Best Dancer Award at the Sino-Italian Cultural Festival of "World Dreams Come True"

On April 19, 2020, He released the single "星河入夢"("Galaxy Dream"). On August 10, He made his acting debut in the Chinese television series Dear Herbal Lord playing the role of 'Chu Qi Xian'. On September 25, he released the single 得自在 (Be At Ease). On November 30, he released the single "幼年時常哼的歌" ("A song that I used to hum when I was young").

2021–present: Produce Camp 2021, and debut with Into1 
On January 5, 2021, Liu Yu participated in the 'Light of Hanfu Lights China' at the "Southern Hanfu Festival"

In February 2021, He participated in the Chinese reality survival show Produce Camp 2021. In March 2021, He became the center of the theme song for the show. He consistently ranked in the high ranks throughout the show, and on the final episode he place first with over 25 million votes, becoming the center and captain of the boy group Into1.

On February 1, 2022, he performed his single "星河入夢" ("Galaxy Dream") at the Spring Festival Gala to welcome the Beijing Winter Olympic Games.

On April 12, 2022 he released his first EP album 柳叶刀(Willow-leaf Saber).

Ambassadorships and endorsements 
Alongside Liu Yu's activities with Into1, he has become the brand ambassador and spokesperson for various brands such as L'Oréal, NET-A-PORTER, L'OCCITANE and more. As well as this, he has appeared as a model for multiple magazines such as Rolling Stone, Ruili, Fashion Health, OK! Wonderful.

Love Ambassador for China Children's Mercy Association Love Health Special Fund (2022)

Discography

Single albums

Singles

Collaborative Singles

Soundtrack Appearances

Other Songs

Composition Credits

Filmography

Television series

Television shows

Hosting

Awards and nominations

Notes

References

External links
 

2000 births
Living people
Singers from Anhui
People from Xuancheng
People from Jing County, Anhui
Chinese idols
Chinese Mandopop singers
Produce 101 (Chinese TV series) contestants
Reality show winners
Into1 members
Chinese male dancers
21st-century Chinese male singers